The women's shot put at the 2016 European Athletics Championships took place at the Olympic Stadium on 6 and 7 July.

Records

Schedule

Results

Qualification

Qualification: 17.30 m (Q) or best 12 performers (q)

Final

References

External links
 amsterdam2016.org, official championship site

Shot Put W
Shot put at the European Athletics Championships
2016 in women's athletics